Paira Mall (1874-1957) was an Indian medical doctor, linguist, and collector for Henry Wellcome's Historical Medical Museum, in London.

Biography
Born in India, Mall served as an army surgeon in the Russo-Japanese War (1904-1905). He was fluent in German, French, Italian, Sanskrit, Persian, Hindi, Punjabi, Arabic and English.

In 1911, he was recruited to work for the Henry Wellcome Historical Medical Museum, in London, to collect objects from South Asia that showed the art and science of healing, and medicinal plants in Ayurvedic medicine - for use in Wellcome's chemical research labs in the UK. He also acquired local medical knowledge by copying and translating manuscripts. He collected for 15 years.

He was a member of the India Society, founded in London, in 1910.

Legacy
From 16 Nov 2017 to 8 April 2018, the Wellcome Collection featured items collected by Paira Mall, including medical objects, paintings, and manuscripts, in the exhibition "Ayurvedic Man: Encounters with Indian Medicine." It also included Paira Mall's written correspondence with Wellcome and his staff while Mall was traveling. According to Apollo magazine, the letters from Mall help trace "the movement of medical and cultural heritage across continents and cultures."

Further reading
The following books are about Paira Mall and his work:
 Allan, Nigel, Pearls of the Orient: Asian Treasures from the Wellcome Library (London: The Wellcome Trust, 2003)
 Friedlander, Peter G., The WIHM Hindi Collection
 Larson, Frances, An Infinity of Things: How Sir Henry Wellcome Collected the World (Oxford: Oxford University Press, 2009)
 Muñoz, Bárbara Rodríguez, Ayurvedic man : encounters with Indian medicine (Wellcome Collection, 2017)

References

1874 births
1957 deaths
19th-century Indian linguists
20th-century Indian linguists
19th-century Indian medical doctors
20th-century Indian medical doctors
People of the Russo-Japanese War
Indian military medical officers
Medical doctors in British India